The first South American Junior Championships in Athletics were held in Buenos Aires, Argentina from April 18–19, 1959.

Participation (unofficial)
Detailed result lists can be found on the "World Junior Athletics History" website.  An unofficial count yields the number of about 59 athletes from about 2 countries:  Argentina (28), Chile (31).

Medal summary
Medal winners are published for men and women
Complete results can be found on the "World Junior Athletics History" website.

Men

Medal table (unofficial)

References

External links
World Junior Athletics History

South American U20 Championships in Athletics
 Sports competitions in Buenos Aires
1959 in Argentine sport
South American U20 Championships
International athletics competitions hosted by Argentina
1959 in South American sport
1959 in youth sport